Wanani Gradi Mariadi (born November 28, 1990), better known by his stage name Gradur, is a French rapper of Congolese origin from Roubaix, Hauts-de-France.<ref name=jeuneafrique>[http://www.jeuneafrique.com/Article/ARTJAWEB20150130130942/ Jeune Afrique: Les sons de la semaine #28 : Moh! Kouyaté, Gradur, J. Martins et Youssou Ndour]</ref> He first gained recognition from a series of freestyles called Sheguey. He started as part of the rap band 59. Enjoying great following online,Générations.fr: Coup dur pour Gradur !!!  he formed his own entourage dubbed Sheguey Squad sheguey meaning "child of the street" in Congolese lingo and released his mixtape ShegueyVara in 2014 with the music video "Traction". His greatly expected debut album L'homme au Bob'' was released on February 23, 2015 with collaborations from Niro, Lacrim, Alonzo (from Psy4 de la Rime), Kayna Samet, Chief Keef and Migos.

Discography

Albums

Mixtapes

Singles

*Did not appear in the official Belgian Ultratop 50 charts, but rather in the bubbling under Ultratip charts.

Featured in

*Did not appear in the official Belgian Ultratop 50 charts, but rather in the bubbling under Ultratip charts.

Other songs

References

External links
Facebook
YouTube
Instagram

French rappers
French people of Democratic Republic of the Congo descent
Living people
1990 births
People from Roubaix
Rappers from Nord